Industrial arbitration is a type of arbitration to prevent or settle labor disputes that may arise between an industrial employer and a union, union member, or union representative to prevent legal action taking place and finding less costly ways to settle disputes.

Taking an issue to court or a breakdown of negotiations can be dangerous for both management and labor, and as such parties are often willing to negotiate and plead their cases with a third party arbiter to come to fair decisions.  Industrial arbitration refers to this process taking place in which labor and management will sit down and solve a dispute.

This process often benefits the employer because it reduces the chances of a strike or legal action, and benefits the employee because it allows them more bargaining power and prevents mass layoffs in a dispute.  However, at times the government has been known to step in regardless of arbitration clauses and force its own remedies.

See also
Compulsory arbitration

References

External links
 

Labour law
Labor relations
Dispute resolution
Industrial agreements